Biermösl Blosn was a Bavarian musical and cabaret band known for combining satirical texts with traditional folk music. It was founded in 1976 by three brothers - ,  and  - and often works with political cabaret artist Gerhard Polt. The name derives from "Beerenmoos" (berry bog), a part of the Haspelmoor in the district of Fürstenfeldbruck that was planned to be transformed in a large airport and a waste dump, and "Blosn", a Bavarian word for "group".

History
Three years later, their first hit Gott mit dir, du Land der BayWa, was broadcast on the Bayerischer Rundfunk (BR) television channel. The song lampoons the Bavarian national anthem changing the text to criticize massive use of fertilizer in Bavarian farming (which was at that time mostly sold by the BayWa). Following the broadcast, the band as well as the journalists at the BR were attacked for such a "sacrilege". This led to the BR not broadcasting the music of the group for years. In 1979, the group first went on stage together with Gerhard Polt. The group announced in August 2011, they will play a final concert in January 2012 and then disband. They gave their last concert in the city of Fürth, Bavaria on January, 18th, 2012.

Music style
The band specializes in combining satirical lyrics with folk melodies to create political songs, mostly endorsing causes of groups of the political left, like the German Green party or the Young Socialists. Aside from their main musical style, they also recorded multiple albums with children's songs together with their own children and have acted in theater shows.

Causes
The band has used their music to protest against multiple projects; amongst them were the planned nuclear reprocessing plant Wackersdorf plant in Wackersdorf, the Bundesautobahn 94, as well as several scandals of the long time governing party of Bavaria, the Christian Social Union of Bavaria.

Critical reactions
In 1997, the band was denied the Upper Bavarian prize for culture for being too "leftist". In 2001, the Bavarian ministry of education disallowed the song Gott mit dir, du Land der BayWa, which was the band's first hit, from being used in a song book for the eighth grade for "lampooning the Bavarian national anthem" and ordered the whole order of books, 75,000 copies, to be destroyed.

Awards
2000 - Wilhelm Hoegner award of the Bavarian SPD (alongside Jörg Hube)
2005 - Deutsche RUTH
2007 - Großer Karl Valentin Preis (together with Gerhard Polt)
Ernst-Hoferichter-Preis   
Award of the Belgischer Rundfunk
Ludwig-Thoma-medal
Prix Pantheon: "Reif und bekloppt"
Green twig (Bund Naturschutz in Bayern)
Grüner Wanninger (German Green party)  
First Bavarian beer award "Der goldene Spaten"

Releases

Studio albums 

Ex voto (1980)
Grüß Gott, mein Bayernland (1982)
Tschüß Bayernland (1985)
Freibank Bayern (feat. Gerhard Polt) (1987, 2007)
Jodelhorrormonstershow (1991)
Sepp, Depp, Hennadreck (children's songs) (1993)
Wo samma (feat. Die Toten Hosen) (1994)
Klampfn Toni (feat. Attwenger, Fredl Fesl, Georg Ringsgwandl, Hans Söllner etc.) (1996)
Wellcome to Bavaria (1998)
Grüaß di Gott Christkindl (Nativity play) (1998)
Erfolg (Audio book feat. Jörg Hube) (2001)
Zing Zang Zing – Sepp, Depp, Hennadreck II (children's songs) (2001)
Räuber & Gendarm (2002)
Der unbekannte Valentin (feat. Gerhard Polt and Gisela Schneeberger) (2002)
Unterbayern (live) (2003)
Auftanz (Bavarian and international folk dances) (2006)
Stoibers Vermächtnis (feat. Gert Heidenreich, Gerhard Polt und Jörg Hube) (2007)
Rundumadum (international children's songs) (2007)
Jubiläum("Best of" album feat. Gerhard Polt) (2009)

DVDs

Bayern Open (feat. Gerhard Polt) (2006)
Tschurangrati (feat. Gerhard Polt) (2006)
Obatzt Is/Crème Bavaroise (feat. Gerhard Polt) (2006)
Offener Vollzug (feat. Gerhard Polt) (2008)

Song books 

 Biermösl Blosn: Das Liederbuch. Haffmans, Zürich 1994, 
 Biermösl Blosn: Grüß Gott, mein Bayernland. Das zweite Liederbuch. Haffmans, Zürich 1994
 Biermösl Blosn: Grüß Gott, mein Bayernland. Econ & List, München 1999, 
 Christoph Well, Hans Well, Reinhard Michl: Sepp, Depp, Hennadreck. Hieber, München, 
 Christoph Well, Michael Well, Hans Well, Reinhard Michl: Zing Zang Zing. Hieber, München, 
 Christoph Well, Michael Well, Hans Well, Reinhard Michl: Grüaß di Gott Christkindl. Hieber, München, 
 Hans Well: Rundumadum. Kein & Aber, Zürich,

Stage productions 

 1984 München leuchtet Münchner Kammerspiele
 1988 Diridari Münchner Kammerspiele
 1993 Tschurangrati Münchner Kammerspiele
 1996 Bayern Open Münchner Kammerspiele
 2002 Crème Bavaroise – Obatzt is Bayerisches Staatsschauspiel
 2005 Abvent
 2006 Offener Vollzug – ein Staatsschauspiel Bayerisches Staatsschauspiel

References

External links
Official homepage

Musical groups established in 1976
German comedy musical groups
German cabaret performers
1976 establishments in West Germany